Maxime Deschamps (born December 20, 1991) is a Canadian pair skater. With his skating partner, Deanna Stellato-Dudek, he is the 2023 Four Continents bronze medalist, 2022 Grand Prix de France champion, 2022 Skate America silver medallist, 2022 CS Nebelhorn Trophy champion, and 2023 Canadian national champion.

With Vanessa Grenier and Sydney Kolodziej, he competed at two Four Continents Championships (2016, 2018) and four Grand Prix events.

Career

Early years 
Deschamps began learning to skate in 1997. He placed 6th in novice pairs with Alysson Dugas at the 2010 Canadian Championships, 10th in junior pairs with Catherine Baldé at the 2011 Canadian Championships, and 7th in junior pairs with Naomie Boudreau at the 2013 Canadian Championships.

Partnership with Grenier 
In 2013, Deschamps teamed up with Vanessa Grenier. The two became the 2014 Canadian junior champions. Making their Grand Prix debut, they placed 6th at the 2014 Skate America. The pair finished 7th at the 2015 Skate Canada International and 8th at the 2016 Four Continents Championships. They were coached by Richard Gauthier and Bruno Marcotte in Montreal, Quebec. Grenier and Deschamps split up in May 2016.

Partnership with Kolodziej 
In 2016, Deschamps teamed up with Sydney Kolodziej from the United States. The pair finished 6th at the 2017 Canadian Championships, ranking 6th in the short program and 4th in the free skate.

Coached by Richard Gauthier, Bruno Marcotte, and Sylvie Fullum in Saint-Leonard, Quebec, Kolodziej/Deschamps made their international debut as a pair in September at the 2017 CS U.S. Classic, where they placed 7th. Skate Canada also selected the pair to compete at a Grand Prix event, the 2017 Skate Canada International. They finished 8th at their Grand Prix assignment and 7th at the 2018 Canadian Championships. They were named in Canada's team to the 2018 Four Continents Championships in Taipei and finished 9th after placing 8th in the short program and 9th in the free skate.

Partnership with Stellato 
Deschamps announced a new partnership with American skater Deanna Stellato in 2019. After securing her release from the USFS, they debuted internationally at the 2021 CS Autumn Classic International, placing fourth. They won the bronze medal at the 2022 Canadian Championships. Stellato/Deschamps went on to finish fourth at the 2022 Four Continents Championships. 

Stellato/Deschamps began the 2022–23 season with a gold medal at the 2022 CS Nebelhorn Trophy. The team was then invited to make their Grand Prix debut at the 2022 Skate America, and won the silver medal, only 3.5 points behind gold medalists Knierim/Frazier. This was the first Grand Prix medal for both skaters. They travelled to Angers for the 2022 Grand Prix de France, their second Grand Prix event, and won the gold medal. This was the first Grand Prix win for both skaters. Their results qualified them for the Grand Prix Final. Stellato/Deschamps entered the event considered likely bronze medalists and placed third in the short program, distantly behind top-ranked teams Knierim/Frazier and Japan's Miura/Kihara and 2.04 points of Italians Conti/Macii. Stellato said she was pleased by the result, revealing that she had "got really ill" in recent weeks and "had to take time off the ice and off the training, and I lost weight, and I lost muscles, so we were training very hard to try and be ready for here." However, the team struggled in the free skate, placing fifth in that segment and dropping behind the Italians for fourth overall. She called this a disappointment but said it was understandable in light of their training difficulties.

Stellato continued to experience health difficulties in the aftermath of the Final, presumed to be a result of respiratory syncytial virus infection, which made her unable to breathe through her mouth. She had limited medical options for dealing with the virus given the need to remain compliant with WADA guidelines. Despite these difficulties, the pair resolved to compete at the 2023 Canadian Championships, with Stellato explaining that "I want it so badly because I want it for Max so much, because this is his tenth Canadian championship and last year I was so proud, I was the first partner you got a medal with in senior. So, to be the partner that brings him the gold would be really special to me." They won the gold medal by a margin of 11.92 points over silver medallists McIntosh/Mimar.

Following the national championships, Stellato eventually recovered from the extended illness, and was assessed as being at "100% of her physical power" for a week in advance of the 2023 Four Continents Championships. They finished second in the short program despite her stepping out of their throw jump. The free skate proved somewhat more difficult, with Deschamps falling on an attempt at the triple Salchow jump. They were third in that segment, albeit with a new personal best score, and won the bronze medal. This was the first ISU championship medal of Deschamps' career.

Programs

With Stellato-Dudek

With Kolodziej

With Grenier

Competitive highlights 
GP: Grand Prix; CS: Challenger Series; JGP: Junior Grand Prix

Pairs with Stellato-Dudek

With Kolodziej

With Grenier

Early partnerships

References

External links
 
 
 

1991 births
Canadian male pair skaters
Living people
People from Vaudreuil-Dorion
Sportspeople from Quebec
Four Continents Figure Skating Championships medalists